"From Afar" is the debut single by Australian singer-songwriter Vance Joy. It was first released on 21 January 2013 as the lead single from Joy's debut EP God Loves You When You're Dancing (2013). It is also featured on his debut studio album Dream Your Life Away (2014).

Joy said "I wrote [it] in 2010 and wrote the outro in 2012, and it’s a been a song I've played regularly the last couple of years because I just think it's a really universal theme of loving someone from a distance. It's a sad kind of song though the outro is a bit more upbeat and slightly more epic. That was something that happened when we produced the song. It's an old favourite of mine anyway."

The song was certified platinum in Australia in 2018.

Music video
The music video for "From Afar" was directed by Lara Kose, co-directed by Charlie Ford and Josh Mckie and released on 14 February 2013.

Certifications

References

2010 songs
2013 debut singles
Vance Joy songs
Songs written by Vance Joy